Chaharbagh; formerly, Chahar Dangeh (Persian: چهار دانگه), also Romanized as Chahār Dāngeh, is a city in the Central District of Chaharbagh County, Alborz province, Iran, and serves as capital of the county. At the National Census in 2006, its population was 5,577 in 1,448 households, at which time it was in the former Chaharbagh District of Savojbolagh County, Tehran province. At the most recent census in 2016, the city had 48,828 inhabitants in 14,380 households, by which time the county had become part of the newly established Alborz province.

References 

Cities in Alborz Province

Populated places in Alborz Province